Helebridge is a hamlet west of Marhamchurch (where the 2011 census population was included ) in northeast Cornwall, England.

References

Hamlets in Cornwall